Enzo Roberto Díaz (born 14 January 1992) is an Argentine professional footballer who plays as a forward for Ferro Carril Oeste, on loan from Club Atlético Tigre.

Career
Díaz started his career in the youth system of Vélez Sarsfield, prior to having a stint with Santamarina. Díaz began his senior career with Jorge Newbery de Lobería in Liga Necochense, before signing for Primera B Metropolitana's UAI Urquiza on 11 August 2016. He scored on his professional debut on 26 August against San Telmo, which was followed by another goal in his next appearance versus Almirante Brown. Díaz finished the 2016–17 campaign with eight goals. He netted fifteen times in his second season, with the goals being spread across fourteen fixtures; his only brace came in May 2018 against Estudiantes.

On 30 June 2018, Díaz completed a move to Ferro Carril Oeste of Primera B Nacional. Six goals followed across his opening twelve appearances, with the forward concluding the campaign with fourteen goals.

Career statistics
.

References

External links

1992 births
Living people
Place of birth missing (living people)
Argentine footballers
Association football forwards
Primera B Metropolitana players
Primera Nacional players
UAI Urquiza players
Ferro Carril Oeste footballers
Club Atlético Tigre footballers